The Cocculinoidea is a superfamily of deepwater limpets (marine gastropods), the only superfamily in the order Cocculinida, one of the main orders of gastropods according to the taxonomy as set up by (Bouchet & Rocroi, 2005). The clade Cocciliniformia used to be designated as a superorder.

Taxonomy
According to Bouchet & Rocroi, 2005, the superfamily Cocculinoidea contains the families Bathysciadiidae and Cocculinidae.

The Cocculinoidea (Cocculinacea Dall, 1882) are combined with the Lepetelliodea (Lepetellacea Dall, 1882) in Cocculinoformia Haszprunar, 1987, referred to as a clade in Bouchet & Rocroi, 2005 although it used to be designated a superorder by Ponder & Lindberg, 1997. Bouchet & Rocroi (2005) leave the Cocculiniformia to consist only of the Cocculinoidea, having moved the Lepetelloidea to the Vetigastropoda.

(Note that before the stipulation by the ICZN, the majority of invertebrate superfamilies ended in -acea, or -aceae, not -oidea.)

Overview of species
Species within the Cocculinoidea include:

 Bathyaltum wareni Haszprunar, 2011
 Bathypelta pacifica (Dall, 1908)
 Bathysciadium concentricum Dall, 1927
 Bathysciadium costulatum (Locard, 1898)
 Bathysciadium rotundum (Dall, 1927)
 Bathysciadium xylophagum Warén & Carrozza in Warén, 1997
 Bonus petrochenkoi Moskalev, 1973
 Xenodonta bogasoni Warén, 1993
 Coccocrater agassizii (Dall, 1908)
 Coccocrater pocillum (Dall, 1890)
 Coccocrater portoricensis (Dall & Simpson, 1901)
 Coccocrater radiatus (Thiele, 1903)
 Coccopigya barbatula B. A. Marshall, 1986
 Coccopigya crebrilamina B. A. Marshall, 1986
 Coccopigya crinita B. A. Marshall, 1986
 Coccopigya hispida B. A. Marshall, 1986
 Coccopigya lata Warén, 1996
 Coccopigya mikkelsenae McLean & Harasewych, 1995
 Coccopigya oculifera B. A. Marshall, 1986
 Coccopigya okutanii Hasegawa, 1997
 Coccopigya punctoradiata (Kuroda & Habe, 1949)
 Coccopigya spinigera (Jeffreys, 1883)
 Coccopigya viminensis (Rocchini, 1990)
 Cocculina alveolata Schepman, 1908
 Cocculina baxteri McLean, 1987
 Cocculina cingulata Schepman, 1908
 Cocculina cowani McLean, 1987
 Cocculina craigsmithi McLean, 1992
 Cocculina dalli A. E. Verrill, 1884
 Cocculina diomedae Dall, 1908
 Cocculina emsoni McLean & Harasewych, 1995
 Cocculina fenestrata Ardila & Harasewych, 2005
 Cocculina japonica Dall, 1907
 Cocculina leptoglypta Dautzenberg & H. Fischer, 1897
 Cocculina messingi McLean & Harasewych, 1995
 Cocculina nassa Dall, 1908
 Cocculina oblonga Schepman, 1908
 Cocculina ovata Schepman, 1908
 Cocculina pacifica Kuroda & Habe, 1949
 Cocculina rathbuni Dall, 1882
 Cocculina subcompressa Schepman, 1908
 Cocculina superba Clarke, 1960
 Cocculina surugaensis Hasegawa, 1997
 Cocculina tenuitesta Hasegawa, 1997
 Cocculina tosaensis Kuroda & Habe, 1949
 Fedikovella beanii (Dall, 1882)
 Fedikovella caymanensis Moskalev, 1976
 Macleaniella moskalevi Leal & Harasewych, 1999
 Paracocculina cervae (Fleming, 1948)
 Paracocculina laevis (Thiele, 1903)
 Teuthirostria cancellata Moskalev, 1976

Fossil species within the Cocculinoidea include:
 † Coccopigya compuncta (Marwick, 1931)
 † Coccopigya komitica B. A. Marshall, 1986
 † Coccopigya otaiana B. A. Marshall, 1986
 † Paracocculina pristina (B. A. Marshall, 1986)

References

 Keen, A.Myra 1958; Sea Shells of Tropical West America, Stanford University Press.
 Moore, R.C. 1952, Gastropods, in Moore, Lalicker, and Fischer; Invertebrate Fossils, McGraw-Hill Book.

Further reading 
 Strong E. E., Harasewych M. G. & Haszprunar G. (2005) "Phylogeny of the Cocculinoidea (Mollusca, Gastropoda)." Invertebrate Biology 122(2): 114-125.

External links 

Gastropod superfamilies
Marine gastropods
Taxa named by William Healey Dall